Alexandre Emmanuel Pharamond (20 October 1876 in Paris – 4 May 1953 in Neuilly-sur-Seine) was the captain of the French rugby union team in the early 20th century.  

He led the team to the Gold Medal in the 1900 Summer Olympics.

References

External links

1876 births
1953 deaths
French rugby union players
Rugby union players at the 1900 Summer Olympics
Olympic gold medalists for France
Medalists at the 1900 Summer Olympics
Rugby union players from Paris